In the Absence of Mrs. Petersen is a 1966 thriller novel by the British writer Nigel Balchin. After the death of his wife, a writer is persuaded by a woman who resembles his wife to pose as her husband and travel with her to her home country of Yugoslavia to retrieve some of her family's wealth.

References

Bibliography
 Clive James. At the Pillars of Hercules. Pan Macmillan, 2013.

1966 British novels
Novels by Nigel Balchin
British thriller novels
Novels about writers
William Collins, Sons books
Novels set in Yugoslavia